The electoral division of Bass is one of the five electorates in the Tasmanian House of Assembly, it includes north-east Tasmania and Flinders Island. Bass takes its name from the British naval surgeon and explorer of Australia: George Bass. The division shares its name and boundaries with the federal division of Bass.

Bass and the other House of Assembly electoral divisions are each represented by five members elected under the Hare-Clark electoral system.

History and electoral profile
Bass was created in 1909 and includes the city of Launceston and towns in the states north east including: Scottsdale, Lilydale, St Helens, George Town and others.

Representation

Distribution of seats

Members for Bass

See also

 Tasmanian Legislative Council

References

External links
Parliament of Tasmania
Tasmanian Electoral Commission - House of Assembly

Bass
North East Tasmania